Hebbal Lake may refer to:
Hebbal Lake, Bangalore, a lake in Karnataka, India
Hebbal Lake, Mysore, Karnataka, India
Hebbal Reservoir, Heggadadevankote, Heggadadevankote Taluk, Mysore district, Karnataka, India